Ruth Taylor (10 January 1961 – 18 February 2006) was a Canadian poet, editor and college  teacher. Born in Lachine, Quebec and raised in Pincourt, Quebec, she attended John Abbott College, McGill University, and Concordia University.

Taylor was the author of three collections of poetry: The Drawing Board (1988); Dragon Papers (1994), a finalist for the A. M. Klein Prize for Poetry; and Comet Wine (2007), published posthumously. The language in these and most of Taylor"s poems is one of a heightened conversation, they are structurally a fusion of the formal and the contemporary.

Taylor taught English literature at John Abbott College from 1986 to 2006.

An active member in Montreal's literary scene since 1979. She gained notoriety as a member of the informal Lakeshore Poets:
... who came out of John Abbott College classes in the early 1980s, including Neil Henden, Ben Soo, Stephen Brockwell and Greg Lamontagne, who ended up being part of the Montreal scene as a kind of second-generation offshoot of the 1970s The Vehicule Poets

She died in February 2006, shortly after completing Comet Wine.

Selected works 
The Drawing Board — 1988
The Dragon Papers — 1994
Muse On!: The Muses Company Anthology 1980-1995 — 1995 (editor)
Comet Wine — 2007

References

External links
Tribute page to Ruth Taylor

1961 births
2006 deaths
20th-century Canadian poets
21st-century Canadian poets
Anglophone Quebec people
Canadian women poets
People from Lachine, Quebec
McGill University alumni
Concordia University alumni
Writers from Montreal
20th-century Canadian women writers
21st-century Canadian women writers